Romeu Tuma (October 4, 1931 – October 26, 2010) was a Brazilian politician and a former director of the Federal Police.

Tuma was born on October 4, 1931, in São Paulo, Brazil. He died on October 26, 2010, of multiple organ dysfunction syndrome, in the Sirio-Libanês Hospital in São Paulo, where he had been since September, suffering from infectious aphonia.

References

1931 births
2010 deaths
Brazilian people of Syrian descent
Deaths from multiple organ failure
People from São Paulo
Brazilian Labour Party (current) politicians
Brazilian police officers
Members of the Federal Senate (Brazil)